The Flag of Batak, otherwise known as the Flag of King Sidabutar is the flag of the Batak people of North Sumatra, Indonesia. It is an equal horizontal tricolour flag, which consists of the colour white, red, and black, the Batak Flag itself has many variations and it doesn't have an official order of colour, namely:

 Red, white, and black.
 Black, white, and red.
 White, red, and black.

Symbolism 
The Flag of Batak as a symbol is an implementation of the values of the Malim faith that states: "The world consists of three worlds, the Upper World (Banua Ginjang) where the Gods live which is resembled by white, the Middle World (Banua Tonga) where mortals live which is resembled by red, and the Lower World (Banua Toru) where the spirits and ghosts live which is resembled by black. The Batak Flag also has philosophical meanings which states, white resembles truth, red resembles bravery, and black resembles leadership.

Uses 

The Flag of Batak is used by the Batak people not as a symbol of separatism but a symbol of identity, the flag of Batak can be seen in sacred Batak places, such as Pusuk Buhit.

References 

Ethnic flags
Flags of Indonesia
Batak